The 2020–21 Randers FC season is the club's eighth consecutive campaign in the Danish Superliga, the top division of football in the country.

In addition to the domestic league, the club also competed in this season's edition of the Danish Cup. On 13 May 2021, Randers defeated SønderjyskE 4–0 in the Danish Cup final, winning just their second ever trophy in Danish football.

Players
As of 7 March 2021

Transfers

In

Out

Competitions

Overview

Danish Superliga

Results summary

Regular season

Results by matchday

League table

Championship round

Matches

Regular season

Championship round

Danish Cup

Statistics

Goalscorers

Last updated: 13 May 2021

Clean sheets

Last updated: 13 May 2021

References

Danish football clubs 2020–21 season